Hadites is a genus of European funnel weavers containing the single species, Hadites tegenarioides. It was  first described by Eugen von Keyserling in 1862, and has only been found in Croatia.

References

Agelenidae
Spiders of Europe
Monotypic Araneomorphae genera
Taxa named by Eugen von Keyserling